"Message" is the eleventh single by Japanese artist Masaharu Fukuyama. It was released on October 2, 1995.

Track listing
Message

Message (Original karaoke)
 (Original karaoke)

Oricon sales chart (Japan)

References

1995 singles
Masaharu Fukuyama songs
Oricon Weekly number-one singles
Songs written by Masaharu Fukuyama
1995 songs